Wimmeria is a genus of shrubs to small trees in the family Celastraceae. It is named after German botanist Christian Friedrich Heinrich Wimmer (1803–1868).

Species
This list may be incomplete.

 Wimmeria acapulcensis Lundell
 Wimmeria acuminata L. O. Williams
 Wimmeria bartlettii Lundell
 Wimmeria caudata Lundell
 Wimmeria chiapensis Lundell
 Wimmeria concolor Cham. & Schltdl.
 Wimmeria crenata Liebm. ex Lundell
 Wimmeria cyclocarpa Radlk. ex Donn. Sm.
 Wimmeria discolor Cham. & Schltdl.
 Wimmeria guatemalensis Rose
 Wimmeria integerrima Turcz.
 Wimmeria lambii (Standl. & L. O. Williams) Lundell (synonym Maytenus lambii)
 Wimmeria lanceolata Rose
 Wimmeria mexicana (Moc. & Sessé ex DC.) Lundell (synonym Celastrus mexicanus)
 Wimmeria microphylla Radlk.
 Wimmeria montana Lundell
 Wimmeria obtusifolia Standl.
 Wimmeria pallida Radlk.
 Wimmeria persicifolia Radlk.
 Wimmeria pubescens Radlk.
 Wimmeria serrulata Radlk.
 Wimmeria sternii Lundell

See also 
Celastrus
Maytenus
Sapindus
Zinowiewia

References

External links 
Celastrus mexicanus Holotype (Fragment)

Neotropical Herbarium Specimens

Type Collections at MICH

 
Celastrales genera
Taxonomy articles created by Polbot